Keegan Lee Akin (born April 1, 1995) is an American professional baseball pitcher for the Baltimore Orioles of Major League Baseball (MLB). He made his MLB debut in 2020.

Amateur career
Akin attended Bullock Creek High School in Midland, Michigan, and Western Michigan University, where he played college baseball for the Western Michigan Broncos. He played collegiate summer baseball with the Chillicothe Paints of the Prospect League in 2014. In 2015, he played collegiate summer baseball with the Bourne Braves of the Cape Cod Baseball League.

Professional career

Minor Leagues
The Baltimore Orioles selected Akin in the second round of the 2016 Major League Baseball draft. He signed with the Orioles, receiving a $1.17 million signing bonus. Akin made his professional debut with the Aberdeen IronBirds and spent all of 2016 there, posting a 1.04 ERA in 26 innings. He spent 2017 with the Frederick Keys where he pitched to a 7–8 record and 4.14 ERA in 21 starts, and he spent 2018 with the Bowie Baysox, going 14–7 with a 3.27 ERA in 25 starts. He spent 2019 with the Norfolk Tides, going 6–7 with a 4.73 ERA and 131 strikeouts over  innings.

The Orioles added Akin to their 40-man roster following the 2019 season.

Major Leagues
Akin was promoted to the major leagues on August 8, 2020. He made his major league debut on August 14 against the Washington Nationals. Akin finished his first MLB season with a 1–2 record and a 4.56 ERA and 35 strikeouts over 8 games and 25.2 innings pitched.

The following season, Akin pitched to a 2–10 record and 6.63 ERA in 24 appearances for Baltimore. His season ended on September 24, when he was shut down for the remainder of the year after suffering a left adductor strain and requiring abdominal surgery.

References

External links

Western Michigan Broncos bio

1995 births
Living people
Aberdeen IronBirds players
Baltimore Orioles players
Baseball players from Michigan
Bourne Braves players
Bowie Baysox players
Frederick Keys players
Major League Baseball pitchers
Norfolk Tides players
People from Alma, Michigan
Salt River Rafters players
Western Michigan Broncos baseball players